The Passing Show of 1916 is a revue featuring the music of Sigmund Romberg and Otto Motzan, with book and lyrics by Harold R. Atteridge.  It  included the first George Gershwin songs introduced in a Broadway show.

It opened in the Winter Garden Theater on June 22, 1916 and played for 140 performances, closing on October 21, 1916.  It was directed by Jacob J. Shubert and J. C. Huffman and choreographed by Allan K. Foster.  The popular song "Pretty Baby" was included in the show.

Background
The original The Passing Show was presented in 1894 by George Lederer at the Casino Theatre.  It featured spoofs of theatrical productions of the past season.  It was one of the first musical revues on Broadway and led the fashion for such productions.  The Casino Theatre produced a revue each summer thereafter for several seasons.  

In 1912, Lee and Jacob J. Shubert began an annual series of twelve elaborate Broadway revues at the Winter Garden Theatre, using the name The Passing Show of 19XX, designed to compete with the popular Ziegfeld Follies.  They featured libretti by Atteridge and music usually by Romberg, Gershwin or Herman Finck.  Willie and Eugene Howard starred in many editions of the series (although not in 1916).  Other stars included Charlotte Greenwood, Marilyn Miller, Ed Wynn, De Wolf Hopper, Charles Winninger, Fred Astaire and his sister Adele, Marie Dressler and Fred Allen. Most of the shows were staged by J. C. Huffman.

Musical numbers

Act 1      
Wine, Woman, and Song      
Ragging the Apache      
So This Is Paris! (Music by Harry Tierney)
Play My Melody      
Sweet and Pretty      
How to Make a Pretty Girl      
Around the Town      
Roosevelt, Wilson and Hughes      
Let Cupid In      
Your Auto Ought To Get Girls      
Pretty Baby (Lyrics by Gus Kahn; music by Egbert Van Alstyne)
What's the Matter With You? (Music and lyrics by Clifton Crawford)
       
Act 2      
Any Night on Broadway      
Broadway School Days      
Romeo and Juliet      
Ragtime Calisthenics      
That's Called Walking the Dog
The Making of a Girl (Co-composed by George Gershwin)
My Runaway Girl" (Music by George Gershwin; lyrics by Murray Roth)

See also
The Passing Show of 1918

References

External links
 New York Times review
 The Passing Show of 1916 on Internet Broadway Database
 Photo from the production

1916 compositions
Broadway musicals
1916 musicals
Musicals by Sigmund Romberg
Revues